The Good Sex Guide is a British documentary TV series presented by Margi Clarke, broadcast on late nights on ITV.

The show ran for three series. It gained unheard-of audience figures of 13 million for a show that aired at 10.35pm, and was rewarded with a win at the Royal Television Society (RTS) Awards for "Best Female Presenter" in 1994. A second series was equally successful, and a third, The Good Sex Guide Abroad, soon followed. Clarke turned down an offer to take the series into a late night chat show format, the host eventually being Toyah Willcox.

References

External links

1993 British television series debuts
1996 British television series endings
Carlton Television
Erotic television series
Sex education television series
Sex education in the United Kingdom